Gemici is a village in the Baskil District of Elazığ Province in Turkey. The village is populated by Kurds of the Herdî tribe and had a population of 352 in 2021.

The hamlet of Mollaköfte is attached to the village.

The village has a mosque that was built in 1939. The construction of a külliye around the mosque was started in 2016 and was finished in 2019. Gemici has a primary and a middle school.

On 12 April 2020, the village was placed into lockdown following villagers testing positive for COVID-19.

References

Villages in Baskil District
Kurdish settlements in Elazığ Province